Ben Ahmed Abdelkrim (born 1 June 1932) is a French long-distance runner. He competed in the men's 5000 metres at the 1952 Summer Olympics.

References

External links

1932 births
Living people
Athletes (track and field) at the 1952 Summer Olympics
French male long-distance runners
Olympic athletes of France
Place of birth missing (living people)
20th-century French people